Lavandula angustifolia, formerly L. officinalis, is a flowering plant in the family Lamiaceae, native to the Mediterranean (Spain, France, Italy, Croatia etc.). Its common names include lavender, true lavender and English lavender (though not native to England); also garden lavender, common lavender and narrow-leaved lavender.

Description

Etymology
The species name angustifolia is Latin for "narrow leaf".  Previously, it was known as Lavandula officinalis, referring to its medicinal properties.

Cultivation
English lavender is commonly grown as an ornamental plant. It is popular for its colourful flowers, its fragrance, and its ability to survive with low water consumption. It does not grow well in continuously damp soil and may benefit from increased drainage provided by inorganic mulches such as gravel. It does best in Mediterranean climates similar to its native habitat, characterised by wet winters and dry summers. It is fairly tolerant of low temperatures and is generally considered hardy to USDA zone 5. It tolerates acid soils but favours neutral to alkaline soils, and in some conditions it may be short-lived.

Cultivars

AGM cultivars
The following cultivars of L. angustifolia and its hybrids have gained the Royal Horticultural Society's Award of Garden Merit:- 

L. × intermedia 'Alba' (large white)
L. angustifolia 'Beechwood Blue'  
L. angustifolia 'Hidcote'  
L. × intermedia 'Hidcote Giant'    
L. angustifolia 'Imperial Gem'  
L. angustifolia ='Clarmo' 
L. angustifolia 'Miss Katherine'  
L. angustifolia ='Scholmis' 
L. angustifolia 'Nana Alba' (dwarf white)
L. × intermedia ='Downoly'     
L × chaytoriae 'Richard Gray'
L. × chaytoriae 'Sawyers' 
L. × intermedia 'Sussex'

Dwarf cultivars
Compacta, Folgate, Dwarf Blue, Dwarf White, Hidcote Pink, Hidcote Superior, Munstead, Nana Atropurpurea, Nana Rosea, Sarah, Summerland Supreme, Lady Lavender
'Hidcote Superior', a compact evergreen shrub  40 cm × 45 cm (16 in × 18 in) with fragrant gray-green foliage and deep violet-blue flowers in summer, prefers full sun, well drained soil, low water, hardy to −30 °C (−20 °F), western Mediterranean species
'Munstead' (syn. Dwarf Munstead, Munstead Blue and Munstead Variety) L. angustifolia variety, 30 cm (12 in) tall, having pink-purple to lavender-blue inflorescences that are slightly fragrant, named after Munstead Wood in Surrey, which was the home of Gertrude Jekyll
'Sarah', grows to 15–60 cm (6–24 in), the flowers are petite, as is the plant, used as a short edging, or as a very fragrant addition to the window box, dark violet flowers
'Lady Lavender', grows to 45 cm (18 in), fragrant, gray-green foliage and lavender-blue flowers in summer, prefers full sun, well-drained soil, low water, hardy to −30 °C (–20 °F)

Semi-dwarf cultivars
Bowles Early, Hidcote Variety, Loddon Blue, Martha Roderick, Jean Davis, Twickle Purple, Pink Perfume
'Hidcote' (syn. Hidcote Variety, Hidcote Blue, Hidcote Purple) L. angustifolia variety. 40 to 50 cm (15 in to 20 in) tall, with silver-gray foliage and deep violet-blue inflorescences, named after Hidcote Manor in England as it was cultivated there by Lawrence Johnston
'Jean Davis' 50–60 cm (20–24 in) tall, up to 1 m (3 ft). A pale pink flowered lavender with exceptionally fruity taste
'Pink Perfume' 60 cm × 45 cm (24 in × 18 in)

Giant cultivars
Alba, Backhouse Purple, Biostos, Bridestowe, Graves, Gray Lady, Gwendolyn Anley, Hidcote Giant, Irene Doyle, Mailette, Middachten
'Hidcote Giant'. A Lavandula × intermedia lavandin. Very vigorous grower (90 to 100 cm; 36–40 in) with a lovely strong fragrance. This has large deep lavender-purple flowers on very long 60 cm (24 in) stems.
'Vera' 75 to 90 cm (30–36 in). Thought to be the original species lavender, harvested for its oil.

Uses

The flowers and leaves are used as a herbal medicine, either in the form of lavender oil or as a herbal tea, to alleviate symptoms such as anxiety, and difficulty falling asleep.

The flowers are also used as a culinary herb, most often as part of the North American version of the French herb blend called herbes de Provence.

Lavender essential oil, when diluted with a carrier oil, is commonly used as a relaxant with massage therapy. Products for home use, such as lotions, eye pillows (including lavender flowers or the essential oil itself) and bath oils, etc., are also used.  Both the petals and the oil are the most popular ingredients in handmade soap.

Dried lavender flowers and lavender essential oil are also used as a prevention against clothing moths, which do not like their scent.

Lavandula angustifolia is included in the Tasmanian Fire Service's list of low flammability plants, indicating that it is suitable for growing within a building protection zone.

Subspecies
Lavandula angustifolia subsp. angustifolia
Lavandula angustifolia subsp. pyrenaica

Hybrids
Lavandula hybrids are referred to as lavandins. Hybrids between  L. angustifolia and L. latifolia (spike lavender) are called Lavandula × intermedia. They bloom later than the ordinary English lavenders.

See also 
Lavandula
Xeriscaping

References

External links

Lavandula angustifolia List of Chemicals (Dr. Duke's Databases)

angustifolia
Drought-tolerant plants
Flora of Spain
Flora of the Pyrenees
Garden plants of Europe
Herbs
Medicinal plants
Flora of the Mediterranean Basin
Plants used in traditional Chinese medicine
Taxa named by Philip Miller
Flora of Malta